Tianna Marie Hawkins (born March 2, 1991) is an American professional basketball player for the Washington Mystics of the Women's National Basketball Association (WNBA). She played college basketball at the University of Maryland and attended Riverdale Baptist School in Upper Marlboro, Maryland.

College statistics

Source

Professional career
Hawkins was drafted by the Seattle Storm with the 6th overall pick in the 2013 WNBA Draft. She played with UNIQA Euroleasing Sopron during the 2013-2014 EuroLeague Women season. Hawkins and Bria Hartley were traded to the Washington Mystics in exchange for Crystal Langhorne on April 14, 2014.

In the WNBA, her career free throw percentage was 49.8%, Rebounds 2.4 a game, and PPG were 4.0.

WNBA statistics

Regular season

|-
| align="left" | 2013
| align="left" | Seattle
| 33 || 0 || 9.7 || .527 || .238 || .846 || 1.6 || 0.2 || 0.3 || 0.1 || 0.7 || 3.4
|-
| align="left" | 2014
| align="left" | Washington
| 34 || 0 || 10.6 || .479 || .294 || .719 || 3.0 || 0.5 || 0.4 || 0.2 || 1.0 || 4.2
|-
| align="left" | 2016
| align="left" | Washington
| 24 || 0 || 10.5 || .494 || .500 || .857 || 2.5 || 0.4 || 0.2 || 0.2 || 1.0 || 4.7
|-
| align="left" | 2017
| align="left" | Washington
| 33 || 1 || 16.6 || .471 || .261 || .953 || 4.2 || 0.3 || 0.5 || 0.2 || 0.8 || 6.9
|-
| align="left" | 2018
| align="left" | Washington
| 32 || 4 || 16.6 || .443 || .357 || .824 || 3.5 || 0.8 || 0.5 || 0.4 || 1.1 || 6.3
|-
| style="text-align:left;background:#afe6ba;" | 2019†
| align="left" | Washington
| 31 || 1 || 15.4 || .514 || .363 || .925 || 4.2 || 0.7 || 0.5 || 0.1 || 1.1 || 9.5
|-
| align="left" | 2020
| align="left" | Washington
| 17 || 5 || 19.4 || .408 || .298 || .846 || 3.5 || 1.0 || 0.8 || 0.4 || 1.2 || 8.5
|-
| align="left" | 2021
| align="left" | Atlanta
| 28 || 8 || 15.5 || .397 || .242 || .913 || 3.1 || 0.6 || 0.4 || 0.5 || 1.1 || 4.9
|-
| align="left" | 2022
| align="left" | Washington
| 25 || 0 || 12.8 || .386 || .264 || .952 || 2.4 || 0.8 || 0.4 || 0.1 || 1.2 || 4.9
|-
| align="left" | Career
| align="left" | 9 years, 3 teams
| 257 || 19 || 13.9 || .459 || .312 || .877 || 3.1 || 0.6 || 0.4 || 0.2 || 1.0 || 5.8
|}

Playoffs

|-
| align="left" | 2013
| align="left" | Seattle
| 1 || 0 || 6.0 || .000 || .000 || .000 || 2.0 || 0.0 || 0.0 || 0.0 || 1.0 || 0.0
|-
| align="left" | 2014
| align="left" | Washington
| 2 || 0 || 13.0 || .700 || 1.000 || 1.000 || 3.0 || 0.5 || 0.0 || 0.0 || 0.0 || 8.0
|-
| align="left" | 2017
| align="left" | Washington
| 5 || 0 || 13.8 || .478 || .286 || 1.000 || 2.0 || 0.4 || 0.0 || 0.2 || 0.2 || 5.2
|-
| align="left" | 2018
| align="left" | Washington
| 9 || 1 || 12.7 || .444 || .333 || .867 || 2.9 || 0.6 || 0.2 || 0.2 || 0.6 || 5.8
|-
| style="text-align:left;background:#afe6ba;" | 2019†
| align="left" | Washington
| 9 || 0 || 9.6 || .682 || .600 || .667 || 2.3 || 0.6 || 0.2 || 0.0 || 0.9 || 4.2
|-
| align="left" | 2020
| align="left" | Washington
| 1 || 0 || 15.0 || .143 || .000 || .750 || 5.0 || 0.0 || 0.0 || 0.0 || 2.0 || 5.0
|-
| align="left" | Career
| align="left" | 6 years, 2 teams
| 27 || 1 || 11.7 || .500 || .400 || .840 || 2.6 || 0.5 || 0.1 || 0.1 || 0.6 || 5.1
|}

References

External links
Maryland Terrapins bio
FIBA Europe profile

Living people
1991 births
African-American basketball players
American expatriate basketball people in China
American expatriate basketball people in Hungary
American women's basketball players
Atlanta Dream players
Basketball players from Washington, D.C.
Henan Phoenix players
Maryland Terrapins women's basketball players
Power forwards (basketball)
Seattle Storm draft picks
Washington Mystics players
21st-century African-American sportspeople
21st-century African-American women